"Hey Tonight" is a song by American rock band Creedence Clearwater Revival from the album Pendulum. It was released as a double A-side with another song from the same album, "Have You Ever Seen the Rain?". The single peaked at position #8 on the Billboard Hot 100, but did not chart in the UK. In Denmark, it was their only song leading the charts.

References

https://www.chartsurfer.de/artist/creedence-clearwater-revival/hey-tonight-song_gcc.html

1971 singles
Creedence Clearwater Revival songs
Songs written by John Fogerty
Fantasy Records singles
Song recordings produced by John Fogerty
Number-one singles in Germany
1971 songs